The National Cornbread Festival is a celebration of cornbread and cornbread-related activities.  The festival, held in South Pittsburg, Tennessee from 1997 to 2019 during the last full weekend in April, will resume in 2022. Among the attractions featured at the National Cornbread Festival are:

 The Cornbread Cookoff 
 The Cornbread Eating Competition
 The Cornbread 5k Race
 Cornbread Alley (a sampling of various cornbread recipes from local organizations)
 Arts and Crafts from area vendors
 Tours of the Lodge Cast Iron Skillet Foundry
 Tours of historic South Pittsburg
 The Cornbread Classic Car Cruise-In
 Live music from performers including perennial favorite, Rhonda Vincent

In the year 2000 the National Cornbread Festival was selected as one of the top 100 events in North America by the American Bus Association.

The COVID-19 pandemic was to blame for all cancellations since 2020; the 24th was deferred to April 2022.

2007 National Cornbread Competition winners

 Cornbread Eating Competition
Matthew Tichenor of Birmingham, AL

Chad Campbell of Florence, AL

 Buttermilk Chug
Nicholas Harris of Huntsville, AL

References
NPR's Day to Day : Voices from the National Cornbread Festival

External links
National Cornbread Festival Official Website

Festivals in Tennessee
Food and drink festivals in the United States
Appalachian culture in Tennessee
Tourist attractions in Marion County, Tennessee
Festivals established in 1997
1997 establishments in Tennessee